Ed Iskenderian (born July 10, 1921), commonly known by his nickname, "Isky", is an American hot rodder and entrepreneur.

Biography

Early life 
He was born to first-generation Armenian immigrants, in "grapevine country of Tulare County, California." Bad weather killed the grapes, compelling his parents to move to Los Angeles. He had an early interest in ham radio; soon, he became fascinated with hot rods.  Like many others, he went lakes racing at Muroc Dry Lake, which was interrupted by the U.S. entry into World War II.

Career
Iskenderian attended L.A.'s  Polytechnic High School. He built a customized Model T, adapting the overhead camshaft conversion kit produced by the Chevrolet brothers (the "Fronty" kit) and the "multi-flathead" cylinder head developed by George Riley. After suffering a number of failures, and experimenting with Model As and Bs, he turned to the crankshaft of the flathead, which had larger bearings; it proved stronger. He fitted Maxi F cylinder heads and a custom-built "slingshot" intake manifold (provided by Ed Winfield). Iskenderian filled the combustion chambers with cast iron, then rebuilt them under the guidance of Winfield, producing an astounding (for the period) 13:1 compression ratio.

At the U.S. entry into World War II, Iskenderian enlisted in the United States Army Air Forces, and flew supply missions in the Pacific Theatre with the USAAF Air Transport Command.

After the war, Iskenderian established a business in a small shop at 5977 Washington Blvd., in Culver City, California; it backed up to Mercury Tool and Die, which was owned by a high school friend of Iskenderian's, John Athan. In this shop, Iskenderian fabricated parts, including camshafts, for fellow hot rodders.  He started with a single cam-grinding machine, which he adapted for the purpose himself.

When the war ended, Iskenderian (like many other hot rodders) applied the experience and expertise gained in the Army to car building. Demand for speed parts was high, so when he was forced to wait five months for a new camshaft, he decided instead to grind his own, with homebuilt grinder, adapted from a cylindrical grinder. Iskenderian's new grinds offered markedly better performance than stock ones. To promote his business early on, Iskenderian took a chance on a new publication, buying an advertisement in the second issue of Honk!; it paid off with new business. He was first to promote his business with T-shirts and uniforms. He would move from the Washington Blvd. location before coming back to Culver City, then ultimately moving the company to Gardena in 1966, where it remains.

Iskenderian was also the first to offer a hard facing on camshafts, and the first to apply computers to cam design. Isky also offered the first camshafts designed to work with hydraulic lifters.

To serve the burgeoning new supercharged fuel dragsters, he developed better lifters, drop-in self-locking roller lifters, and anti-pump-up hydraulic lifters (suitable for high-rev use). The high valve lifts and long durations demanded better valve springs, too, so Isky produced the Vasco Jet 1000 springs. He worked with Don Garlits, creating the first corporate sponsorship deal in drag racing:  The Don's Speed Shop/Ed Iskendarian dragster, which turned in a record 8.36 second/ pass with Garlits at the wheel. In the 1950s, Iskendarian was the first to offer contingency awards to racers; these small cash payments for applying corporate decals help amateurs continue to race, and have become big business.

Not limiting his focus, Iskendarian offered the first complete valvetrain kits, including camshaft and valve gear, for stock racing classes, as well as street cars. He also produced the first roller lifter cams for Chevrolet engines and the first bushings and cam keys to allow cam timing to be adjusted.

Iskendarian got together with Vic Edelbrock, Jr., Roy Richter, Bob Hedman, Robert E. Wyman, John Bartlett, Phil Weiand Jr, Dean Moon, Al Segal, and Willie Garner in 1963, forming the Speed Equipment Manufacturers Association, now known as SEMA, serving as its first president during 1963-1964.

Honours
In 1985, Iskendarian was named one of Chevrolet's "Legends of Performance".

The company he founded is now located in Gardena, California.

He turned 100 in July 2021.

Notes

External links 
Hot Rod.com
Hot Rod.com (obit)
Isky bio
Car and Driver online (interview)
Theshopmag.com (profile)
Hemmings.com (profile)
Google Books 
Competitionplus.com

1921 births
Drag racing
People from Tulare County, California
Military personnel from California
Land speed record people
Living people
American centenarians
Men centenarians
American manufacturing businesspeople
Racing drivers from California
American people of Armenian descent
United States Army Air Forces pilots of World War II
Amateur radio people